The enzyme 3′,5′-cyclic-GMP phosphodiesterase (EC 3.1.4.35) catalyzes the reaction

guanosine 3′,5′-cyclic phosphate + H2O  guanosine 5′-phosphate

This enzyme belongs to the family of hydrolases, specifically those acting on phosphoric diester bonds.  The systematic name is 3′,5′-cyclic-GMP 5'-nucleotidohydrolase. Other names in common use include guanosine cyclic 3',5'-phosphate phosphodiesterase, cyclic GMP phosphodiesterase, cyclic 3′,5′-GMP phosphodiesterase, cyclic guanosine 3′,5′-monophosphate phosphodiesterase, cyclic guanosine 3′,5′-phosphate phosphodiesterase, cGMP phosphodiesterase, cGMP-PDE, and cyclic guanosine 3′,5′-phosphate phosphodiesterase.

Structural studies

References 

 

EC 3.1.4
Enzymes of known structure